is a former Japanese football player.

Playing career
Nakayama was born in Miyazaki on November 7, 1981. After graduating from high school, he joined J1 League club Gamba Osaka in 2000. Although he played many matches as substitute forward form 2004, he could not become a regular player. In June 2005, he moved to J1 club Nagoya Grampus Eight on loan and played many matches. In 2006, he returned to Gamba Osaka. Although he played many matches as substitute forward in 2006, he could hardly play in the match in 2007. In 2008, he moved to J2 League club Roasso Kumamoto. He played many matches as regular player in 2008. However his opportunity to play decreased in 2009 and left the club end of 2009 season. In May 2010, he joined J2 club Mito HollyHock and played many matches as substitute forward. In 2011, he moved to Japan Football League (JFL) club V-Varen Nagasaki. He became a regular player and scored 11 goals in 2012. The club also won the champions and was promoted to J2 from 2013. However he could not play at all in the match in 2013. In August 2013, he moved to JFL club FC Ryukyu. He played many matches and the club was promoted to new league J3 League from 2014. He played many matches as regular player until 2015 and retired end of 2015 season.

Club statistics

Honors
Asian Games Top Scorer : 2002
Toulon Tournament Top Scorer: 2002

References

External links

1981 births
Living people
Association football people from Miyazaki Prefecture
Japanese footballers
J1 League players
J2 League players
J3 League players
Japan Football League players
Gamba Osaka players
Nagoya Grampus players
Roasso Kumamoto players
Mito HollyHock players
V-Varen Nagasaki players
FC Ryukyu players
Asian Games medalists in football
Footballers at the 2002 Asian Games
Asian Games silver medalists for Japan
Association football forwards
Medalists at the 2002 Asian Games